Taichung City Second Market, formerly Shintomichō Market, is a public market located in Central District, Taichung, Taiwan that is known for its local cuisine.

History 

Taichung City Second Market was built in 1917 by the Japanese colonial government as the second out of five planned marketplaces in Taichung. Like the first market (currently ASEAN Square), the Second Market was built with three wings extending radially from the center. The market was located in Shintomichō, whose residents were mostly Japanese; hence, it was known as the "Japanese market". The Second Market sold higher-end food and clothing for its affluent customers. During this time, the market also sold fruit and vegetables wholesale.

The market was already too small during the Japanese era, and the trend worsened when the Kuomintang took over. Therefore, additional buildings were built around the original and completely surrounded it. However, the market's commercial importance diminished with the westward shift of the city's central business district, the arrival of department stores, and the construction of public markets specifically for wholesale fruit and vegetables. 

In the late 20th century, the market transitioned into a tourist attraction known for its wide offerings of Taiwanese cuisine. Renovation projects also helped improve the "dirty" public image of the market. One stall selling ba-wan inside the market is mentioned in the Michelin Guide.

Architecture 
The market has a total floor space of 2,388 ping and has a total of 331 vendors inside (54 stores, 150 permanent stalls, 107 temporary stalls). The market is composed of a Japanese-era structure with three wings surrounded by street-facing qilou on all sides. The original Japanese building is built of brick, a style popular during the Taishō era. In the middle of the three wings, there is a two-story hexagonal tower, which was once the tallest structure in Taichung and had a bell serving as a fire alarm. There are six hallways extending from the center in a radial fashion.

Gallery

See also 
 Miyahara Ice Cream

References

External links 
 

Market halls
Retail markets in Taiwan
Buildings and structures in Taichung
1917 establishments in Taiwan
Commercial buildings completed in 1917